Leszek Roman Deptuła (25 February 1953 – 10 April 2010) was a Polish veterinarian and politician, member of the Sejm. He was born in Żagań.

Deptulas was listed on the flight manifest of the Tupolev Tu-154 of the 36th Special Aviation Regiment carrying the President of Poland Lech Kaczyński which crashed near Smolensk-North airport near Pechersk near Smolensk, Russia, on 10 April 2010, killing all aboard.

On 16 April 2010 Deptulas was decorated posthumously with the Commander's Cross of the Order of Polonia Restituta. Four days later, he was buried at the municipal cemetery in Mielec.

References

1953 births
2010 deaths
People from Żagań
Members of the Polish Sejm 2007–2011
Voivodeship marshals of Poland
Podkarpackie Voivodeship
Victims of the Smolensk air disaster
Polish veterinarians
Recipients of the Silver Cross of Merit (Poland)
Knights of the Order of Polonia Restituta
Commanders of the Order of Polonia Restituta